The Asian Table Tennis Union (ATTU) is an Asian table tennis governing body formed on May 7, 1972, and recognized by International Table Tennis Federation (ITTF) in 1975. ATTU was founded by 16 member associations, currently, 44 member associations are affiliated to ATTU.

Founding history
After Chinese Civil War, fighting between China and Taiwan spread into diplomatic fields, including sports organizations. During the 1960s, Taiwan was not a member of International Table Tennis Federation (ITTF), but was affiliated to Table Tennis Federation of Asia (TTFA). China was totally opposite. In 1968, ITTF had decided that only those countries affiliated to ITTF be allowed to gain membership in its continental affiliates.
Taiwan did not join ITTF because ITTF refused to recognize Taiwan as China while Taiwan was recognized by International Olympic Committee under the name of Republic of China.
In February 1971, TTFA delegates thought the ITTF had no powers to dictate terms to the Asian body, and decided to keep Taiwan's membership which had existed since 1957.
The decision caused Koji Koto, the president of TTFA, to resign.
Koji Koto, as the president of Japan Table Tennis Association, later promised China that he would make an effort to withdraw Japan from TTFA and form a new group with Chinese.

On May 7, 1972, after 4-day meeting in Beijing, Asian Table Tennis Union (ATTU) was officially formed with 16 member associations: Cambodia, China, DPR Korea, Iran, Iraq, Japan, Kuwait, Lebanon, Malaysia, Nepal, Pakistan, Palestine, Singapore, Sri Lanka, Syria and Vietnam.
ATTU was officially recognized by International Table Tennis
Federation as a continental body for Asia at its 33rd Congress in Calcutta, 1975.

Members
Total 44 member associations of ATTU are divided into 5 regional groups: (March 2012)

2 Associate Members affiliated to Oceania Table Tennis Federation (OTTF) and ITTF:
 - Australian Table Tennis Association
 - New Zealand Table Tennis Association Inc

Not an ATTU member but affiliated to ITTF:
 - East Timor Table Tennis Association

Competitions
List of events sanctioned by ATTU or ATTU regional groups:

List of events held by ATTU members and other organizations:

a.  MT/WT: Men's/Women's Teams; MS/WS: Men's/Women's Singles; MD/WD: Men's/Women's Doubles; XD: Mixed Doubles
b.  Indicates the year in which table tennis was first included as competition sports, NOT the inauguration of the multi-sports events.

See also

International Table Tennis Federation
European Table Tennis Union

References

External links

 
Table tennis organizations
T
Table tennis in Asia